The cù-sìth(e), plural coin-shìth(e) is a mythical hound found in Scottish folklore. A similar creature exists in Irish folklore (spelled cú sídhe), and it also bears some resemblance to the Welsh Cŵn Annwn.

The cù-sìth is thought to make its home in the clefts of rocks and to roam the moors of the Highlands.  It is usually described as having a shaggy, dark green coat and being as large as a small cow.

According to legend, the creature was capable of hunting silently, but would occasionally let out three terrifying barks, and only three, that could be heard for miles by those listening for it, even far out at sea.  Those who hear the barking of the Cù-Sìth must reach safety by the third bark or be overcome with terror to the point of death.

See also
 Aos Sí
 Black dog
 Black Shuck
 Cat Sìth
 Cŵn Annwn

References

Aos Sí
Fairies
Fantasy creatures
Irish folklore
Irish legendary creatures
Mythological dogs
Mythological canines
Scottish legendary creatures
Scottish mythology
Tuatha Dé Danann